This is an alphabetical list of villages in Ghazipur district, Uttar Pradesh, India.

A–C 

 Abhaipur
 Akhini
 Amarupur
 Arangi
 Asaichandpur
 Asawar
 Athahatha
 Awathahi Basant
 Bakainia
 Baksara
 Balua
 Bara
 Basuka
 Bhaksi
 Bhimapar district
 Bhurkura
 Birpur
 Chitarkoni

D–F 

 Dehriya
 Deorhi
 Deva Village
 Dewaitha
 Dhamupur
 Dumri
 Faridpur, Usia
 Firozpur
 Fufuao

G–J 

 Gagran
 Gahmar
 Gaighat
 Gaura
 Gondaur
 Gorasara
 Hasanpura
 Jogiyamar
 Jaburna
 Jalalabad
 Jalalpur
 Jevpur
 Joga Musahib

K–M 

 Kabirpur
 Kadirpur
 Kamesaradih
 Kanuan
 Karimuddinpur
 Karmahari
 Khanpur
 Khardiha
 Khiddipur-Mathare
 Kudva
 Kundesar
 Lathudih
 Mahali
 Mahend
 Medinipur
 Mircha
 Mirzabad
 Muhammadpur T Chaudhari Azmal

N–R 

 Nagsar
 Narsinghpur
 Nawali
 Nirahukapura
 Pakhanpura
 Pakri
 Palia
 Parsa
 Patakaniya
 Phooli
 Raipur
 Rajapur
 Rakasaha
 Reotipur

S–Z 

 Sadhopur
 Saraila
 Sarhuja
 Semra
 Sherpur
 Sonwani
 Suhwal
 Sukhdehri
 Sultanpur
 Tajpur Manjha
 Tajpur
 Taraon
 Thanaipur
 Tilwa
 Tiyari
 Tokawa
 Umar Ganj
 Usia
 Zabran Pur
 Zahurabad

Ghazipur district